Ewa Błaszczyk (born 15 October 1955) is a Polish actress. She has made over 35 appearances in film and television. She starred in Krzysztof Kieślowski's Dekalog: Nine and in the 1980s TV series Zmiennicy.

References

External links
 

1955 births
Living people
Polish film actresses
Actresses from Warsaw
Polish television actresses
20th-century Polish actresses
21st-century Polish actresses